This is a list of rulers and office-holders of Ireland.

Heads of states
High Kings of Ireland
Kings of Ireland
Lords of Ireland
President of Dáil Éireann (During the revolution)
President of Ireland (1938–present)

Heads of government
Presidents of the Executive Council (1922–1937)
Taoisigh of Ireland (prime minister) (1937–present)
Tánaistí of Ireland (1937–present)

Heads of former states
Kings of Connacht
Kings of Ulster
Kings of Leinster
Kings of Munster
Kings of Breifne
Kings of East Breifne

British governors
Lord Deputies and Lord Lieutenants of Ireland
Chief Secretary for Ireland
Lord Chancellors of Ireland
Governor-General of the Irish Free State (1922–1936)
Secretary of State for Northern Ireland

Courts office-holders
Attorneys-General for Ireland
Attorneys General (1922–present)

Ministers
Irish Foreign Ministers

See also
Lists of office-holders

Lists of European rulers